Asta Hansen (20 December 1914 – 21 October 1962) was a Danish stage and film actress.

Asta Betty Hansen was born in Store Magleby to Grete Sofie (née Lundqvist) and Arthur Jørgen Hansen. She first acted in pantomimes and then in 1934 appeared at the Folketeatret, Copenhagen. She subsequently appeared in many revues and operettas but her career became less busy in the 1950s.

She was married to Gottfred Havsteen who was also her manager.

Filmography
Sjette trækning - 1936
Der var engang en vicevært - 1937
Bolettes brudefærd (The Wedding of Bolette) - 1938, director Emanuel Gregers
En mand af betydning - 1941
Alle går rundt og forelsker sig - 1941
Peter Andersen - 1941
Alt for karrieren - 1943
Erik Ejegods pilgrimsfærd - 1943

References

External links

Danish stage actresses
Danish film actresses
1914 births
1962 deaths
20th-century Danish actresses
People from Dragør Municipality